Nilgiri-class frigate may refer to:

 , a class of frigates that served in the Indian Navy between 1972 and 2013.
 , a class of frigates built for the Indian Navy since 2017.